Leo Breiman (January 27, 1928 – July 5, 2005) was a distinguished statistician at the University of California, Berkeley. He was the recipient of numerous honors and awards, and was a member of the United States National Academy of Sciences.

Breiman's work helped to bridge the gap between statistics and computer science, particularly in the field of machine learning. His most important contributions were his work on classification and regression trees and ensembles of trees fit to bootstrap samples. Bootstrap aggregation was given the name bagging by Breiman. Another of Breiman's ensemble approaches is the random forest.

See also 
 Shannon–McMillan–Breiman theorem

Further reading 
 Leo Breiman obituary, from the University of California, Berkeley
 Richard Olshen "A Conversation with Leo Breiman," Statistical Science Volume 16, Issue 2, 2001

Random Forests

External links 

Leo Breiman from PORTRAITS OF STATISTICIANS
A video record of a Leo Breiman's lecture about one of his machine learning techniques
Statistical Modeling: The Two Cultures (with comments and a rejoinder by the author)

1928 births
2005 deaths
American statisticians
Fellows of the American Statistical Association
Machine learning researchers
Members of the United States National Academy of Sciences
University of California, Berkeley College of Letters and Science faculty
Computational statisticians